Heath Park is an area of the London Borough of Havering situated to the east of Romford. It is a largely Edwardian estate built as a result of railway expansion.

The district is located to the east of the Romford–Upminster railway line. It was built from around 1908 in the east of the parish of Romford, adjacent to Hornchurch.

References

Areas of London
Districts of the London Borough of Havering
Romford